Tassy is a French surname. Notable people with this surname include:

 Antoine Tassy (born 1924), Haitian football player and manager
 Fernande Tassy (born 1903), French fencer
 Jean Tassy, Haitian football player and manager
 Joseph Héliodore Garcin de Tassy (1794–1878), French orientalist

See also
 Tassy Johnson (1916–1981), Australian cyclist